This list of broadsheets is a list of notable newspapers which are published in broadsheet format.

Argentina

La Nación, a national  newspaper: Since 31 October 2016, only weekend editions are printed on the traditional broadsheet format.
Los Andes, Mendoza's newspaper
La Gaceta, Tucumán's newspaper
La voz del interior, Córdoba's newspaper

Australia

The Australian, a national newspaper
The Age, was historically a broadsheet before more recently becoming a tabloid.

Bangladesh
Most Bangladeshi daily newspapers are broadsheets.

The Daily Star, a broadsheet English-language daily
The Bangladesh Observer, oldest continuously published English-language daily 
Daily Naya Diganta, a broadsheet Bengali-language daily
The Daily Ittefaq, oldest and most circulated newspaper 
New Age
The Independent

Brazil
Most Brazilian newspapers are broadsheets, including the three most important:

O Globo, Rio de Janeiro
Folha de S.Paulo, São Paulo
Estado de Minas, Belo Horizonte

Canada
Almost all of Canada's major daily newspapers are broadsheets. Newspapers are in English, unless stated otherwise.

National

The Globe and Mail
The National Post
Le Devoir (French)

Atlantic Canada

The Telegram, St. John's
The Chronicle-Herald, Halifax
The Times & Transcript, Moncton
The Telegraph-Journal, Saint John, New Brunswick
The Daily Gleaner, Fredericton
The Charlottetown Guardian
Cape Breton Post, Sydney, Nova Scotia

Quebec

The Gazette, Montreal
La Presse, Montreal (French)
Le Devoir, Montreal (French)

Ontario

The Hamilton Spectator
The Kingston Whig-Standard
The London Free Press
The Ottawa Citizen
The Pembroke Daily Observer
The Peterborough Examiner
The St. Catharines Standard
The Sudbury Star
The Chronicle-Journal
The Toronto Star
The Waterloo Region Record, Kitchener-Waterloo and Cambridge
The Windsor Star

Prairies

The Winnipeg Free Press
The Brandon Sun, Brandon, Manitoba
The Saskatoon Star-Phoenix
The Regina Leader Post
The Edmonton Journal
The Red Deer Advocate, Red Deer, Alberta
The Calgary Herald
The Lethbridge Herald

British Columbia

The Vancouver Sun, Vancouver, British Columbia
The Victoria Times-Colonist, Victoria, British Columbia

Chile
El Mercurio
El Sur

China
China Daily

Colombia
El Tiempo
El Espectador (switched to tabloid in 2008)
El Colombiano (switched to tabloid in 2012)
El Pais

Denmark

Jyllands-Posten (switched to tabloid in 2008)
Politiken
Weekendavisen
Kristeligt Dagblad

Dominican Republic

Listín Diario
Hoy
La Información, Santiago de los Caballeros

Ecuador
Most are broadsheets.

Finland

Keskisuomalainen
Turun Sanomat
Österbottens Tidning

France

 L'Équipe (formerly)

Germany
Broadsheet is not common. National daily newspapers as Die Zeit, Die Welt, Süddeutsche Zeitung, Frankfurter Allgemeine Zeitung and Bild use Nordisch Format with 570 mm × 400 mm (22 in × 16 in) (1.425 aspect ratio).

Greece
Kathimerini
Estia

Hong Kong

South China Morning Post
Hong Kong Economic Journal

Hungary

 Magyar Nemzet
 Magyar Hírlap
 Népszava

India
Almost all major newspapers in India are broadsheets. Tabloids are mostly found in small-circulation local or rural papers.

Law Sapient
Amar Ujala
Anandabazar Patrika
Eenadu
Aajkaal
Bartaman
DNA
Deccan Chronicle
Deccan Herald
Dinamalar
Dinathanthi
Dainik Jagran
Dainik Bhaskar
Ei Samay
Ekdin
Ganashakti
Hindustan
Hosa Digantha
Kannada Prabha
Lokmat
Prajavani
Pudhari
Sakshi
Sakal
Saamana
Samyuktha Karnataka
Sangbad Pratidin
State Times
Sudharma
The Financial Express
The Indian Express
The Economic Times
The Hindustan Times
The Hindu
The Hitavada
The New Indian Express
The Statesman
The Telegraph
The Times of India
Dainik Navajyoti
Malayala Manorama
Mathrubhumi
Varthabharathi
Imphal Free Press
Udayavani
Vijaya Karnataka
Vijaya Vani
Vishwavani
Deepika

Indonesia

Jawa Pos
Kompas

Ireland

Business Post
Irish Examiner
Irish Independent (Business, Motors, Property supplements only; the rest switched to tabloid in December 2012, though Sport On Saturday was published as a broadsheet between 29 August 2015 and 23 November 2019)
The Irish Times
Sunday Independent

Israel

Makor Rishon

Haaretz

Italy

Avvenire
Il Foglio
Il Mattino
Il Messaggero
Il Sole 24 Ore
La Sicilia

Japan

The Japan Times (English)

Almost all major papers in Japan are Blanket (54.6 cm x 40.65 cm), not Broadsheet.

Below major newspapers are printed on Blanket.
Asahi Shimbun
Chunichi Shimbun
Mainichi Shimbun
Nihon Keizai Shimbun
Nikkan Sports
Sankei Shimbun
Seikyo Shimbun
Shimbun Akahata
Tokyo Sports
Yomiuri Shimbun

Lebanon
An-Nahar

Libya

Libya
Al Mayadeen

Malaysia
Newspapers such as New Straits Times and Berita Harian used to be published in broadsheet, but were published in the smaller size, instead, from 2005 and 2008, respectively. However, almost all Chinese newspapers in the country continue to publish in broadsheet.

The Borneo Post
Utusan Borneo
Utusan Malaysia
Nanyang Siang Pau
Sin Chew Daily
Kwong Wah Yit Poh

Mauritius

L'Express
The Independent

Mexico

El Informador, Guadalajara, Jalisco
El Universal, Mexico City
El Norte, Monterrey, Nuevo León

New Zealand

The New Zealand Herald, Auckland. Only the Saturday edition is broadsheet, the weekday editions switched to compact in September 2012.
Waikato Times, Hamilton. Only the Saturday edition is broadsheet, the weekday editions switched to compact in April 2018.
The Dominion Post, Wellington. Only the Saturday edition is broadsheet, the weekday editions switched to compact in April 2018.
The Press, Christchurch. Only the Saturday edition is broadsheet, the weekday editions switched to compact in April 2018.
Otago Daily Times, Dunedin
Taranaki Daily News, New Plymouth. Only the Saturday edition is broadsheet, the weekday editions switched to compact in April 2018.
The Southland Times, Invercargill. Only the Saturday edition is broadsheet, the weekday editions switched to compact in April 2018.

Pakistan
All Pakistan regional and national newspapers are broadsheets. Pakistan Today is the first and only paper in Berliner format.

The News International
Dawn
Express Tribune
The Daily Times
Daily Express
The Nation

Panama

La Prensa
Formerly:*La Estrella de Panamá (Tabloid)

Peru

El Comercio, Lima

Philippines

Philippine Daily Inquirer
The Philippine Star
Manila Bulletin
Manila Standard
The Manila Times
The Daily Tribune
BusinessWorld
Business Mirror
Chinese Commercial News (菲律賓商報) 
Manila Shimbun (日刊まにら新聞)
United Daily News (聯合日報)
World News (世界日報)

Poland
All of Poland's quality national dailies (Gazeta Wyborcza, Rzeczpospolita, Nasz Dziennik, and Dziennik Polska-Europa-Świat) are now published in compact format.

Portugal
Expresso, Lisboa

Puerto Rico
El Mundo

Romania

Jurnalul Național, Bucharest

Russia

Izvestia
Kommersant
Russia Beyond the Headlines
"Rossiyskaya Gazeta"

Serbia

Politika

Singapore
The Straits Times
Lianhe Zaobao
Berita Harian (Singapore)

Sri Lanka
The Sunday Leader

South Africa

Beeld
Pretoria News
The Star
The Sunday Times
Die Burger
The Cape Times

Spain
All newspapers in Spain are printed in compact format.

Sweden
The first major Swedish newspaper to leave the broadsheet format and start printing in tabloid format was Svenska Dagbladet, on 16 November 2000. As of August 2004,  26 newspapers were broadsheets, with a combined circulation of 1,577,700 and 50 newspapers were in a tabloid with a combined circulation of 1,129,400. On 5 October 2004, the morning newspapers Göteborgs-Posten, Dagens Nyheter, Sydsvenskan, and Östersunds-Posten all switched to tabloid, thus making it the leading format for morning newspapers in Sweden by volume of circulation. Most other broadsheet newspapers have followed, since. The last daily Swedish newspaper to switch to tabloid was Jönköpings-Posten, 6 November 2013.

Thailand
Thairath
The Bangkok Post

Turkey
Most of the newspapers in Turkey are printed on this format. Notable ones include:

Cumhuriyet
Sabah
Hürriyet
Milliyet
Posta

Ukraine
Dzerkalo Tyzhnia

United Arab Emirates

Khaleej Times
The National

Gulf News

United Kingdom

UK wide

The Daily Telegraph (The Sunday Telegraph)
The Financial Times (Monday to Saturday only)
The Sunday Times

England
Yorkshire Post

Scotland

The Herald

United States
Almost all major papers in the United States are broadsheets.

Albuquerque Journal
The Arizona Republic
Arizona Daily Star
The Atlanta Journal-Constitution
The Bakersfield Californian
The Baltimore Sun
The Birmingham News
The Boston Globe
The Buffalo News
The Charlotte Observer
Chattanooga Times Free Press
Chicago Tribune
The Courier Journal
The Dallas Morning News
The Democrat and Chronicle
The Denver Post
Detroit Free Press
The Florida Times-Union
The Forum of Fargo-Moorhead
The Fresno Bee
The Grand Rapids Press
Houston Chronicle
The Indianapolis Star
The Inquirer and Mirror
The Kansas City Star
Las Vegas Review-Journal
Lincoln Journal Star
Los Angeles Daily News
Los Angeles Times
The Mercury News
The Miami Herald
Milwaukee Journal Sentinel
New Hampshire Union Leader
New York Law Journal
The New York Times
The Oklahoman
Omaha World-Herald
The Orange County Register
Orlando Sentinel
The Philadelphia Inquirer
Pittsburgh Post-Gazette
The Plain Dealer
Portland Press Herald
Press-Telegram
The Providence Journal
The Riverdale Press
The Seattle Times
The Salt Lake Tribune
San Antonio Express-News
The San Bernardino Sun
San Francisco Chronicle
Santa Fe New Mexican
Star Tribune
The Star-Ledger
The Sun
Tampa Bay Times
The Tampa Tribune
The Times-Picayune
The Times-Tribune
U-T San Diego
USA Today
Vineyard Gazette
The Wall Street Journal
The Washington Post
The Washington Times
The Wichita Eagle
The Zephyrhills News

Vatican City
L'Osservatore Romano

References 

Lists of newspapers